Jared Christopher Brossett (born October 1982)  was a member of the New Orleans City Council from February 2014 to January 2022 representing District D. He served as Chair of the New Orleans City Council's Budget, Audit and Board of Review Committee. He also served on the Transportation, Utilities, Government Affairs, Economic Development and Special Projects, and Community Development committees.

Council member Brossett is also a member of the Louisiana Super Region Rail Authority and was appointed by Governor John Bel Edwards to the Task Force on Transportation and Infrastructure Investment.

Biography 
Brossett is the son of Brenda M. Brossett and Elery Michael Brossett. He graduated from McDonogh 35 Senior High School in New Orleans and holds a bachelor's degree in political science from Xavier University of Louisiana. He is a member of the Orleans Parish Democratic Executive Committee.

Career 
Brossett was formerly a member of the Louisiana House of Representatives, where he represented District 97 in New Orleans, Louisiana. He was first elected in May 2009 during a special election. During his years in the legislature, he was Chairperson of the Select Committee on Hurricane Recovery, where he worked to uncover the corruption and mismanagement of the state-run Katrina Recovery programs. Brossett also served on the Appropriations; House and Governmental Affairs; Municipal, Parochial, and Cultural Affairs; and Homeland Security committees.

Brossett was succeeded in the House by another Democrat, Joseph Bouie, Jr., a retired professor and administrator at Southern University at New Orleans. Coincidentally, Bouie had run unsuccessfully against Brossett for the City Council just a few months earlier.

Drunk driving 
On May 14, 2006, Brossett was arrested on charges of drunk driving in Miami Beach, FL. At the time he was an aide to then-City Councilwoman Cynthia Hedge Morrell. He later pled no contest to a charge of reckless driving.

On June 14, 2020, Brossett was again arrested under suspicion of a DWI in New Orleans, LA after crashing a city-owned vehicle. On June 15, Brossett announced he would seek substance abuse treatment, but was seen back at work as the City Councilmember for District D within a week of this date. On August 10, Brossett entered a "not guilty" plea to the charges against him.

On October 18, 2021, amid a run for the city council's at-large seat, Brossett was arrested again for suspected DWI.

Notes

1982 births
Living people
African-American state legislators in Louisiana
Democratic Party members of the Louisiana House of Representatives
New Orleans City Council members
Politicians from New Orleans
Xavier University of Louisiana alumni
21st-century American politicians
21st-century African-American politicians
20th-century African-American people